Helbeck of Bannisdale is a novel by Mary Augusta Ward, first published in 1898.  It was one of her five bestselling novels.

Notes

Further reading

 Barfoot, Gabrielle (1996). "Helbeck of Bannisdale: A Study in Religious Conflict," Prospero: Rivista di Culture Anglo-germaniche, Vol. 3, pp. 145–52.
 Clarke, R.F. (1898). "A Catholic's View of 'Helbeck of Bannisdale'," The Nineteenth Century, Vol. 44, pp. 455–467.
 Burton, Richard (1898). "Mrs. Ward's Tragedy of Conscience," The Book Buyer, Vol. 17, pp. 56–57.
 Gwynn, Stephen (1917). "Helbeck of Bannisdale and Eleonor." In: Mrs. Humphry Ward. London: Nisbet & Co., pp. 61–82.
 Heuser, H.J. (1898). "What Are We to Think of 'Helbeck of Bannisdale'," The American Ecclesiastical Review, Vol. 19, pp. 528–536.
 Mallock, M.M. (1898). "Mrs. Humphry Ward's Latter Day Gospel," The Messenger, Vol. 39, pp. 263–277.
 Mivart, St. George (1898). "Another Catholic's View of 'Helbeck of Bannisdale'," The Nineteenth Century, Vol. 44, pp. 641–655.
 Myers, Joanna Shaw (1996). "Hopkins and Mrs. Humphry Ward’s Helbeck of Bannisdale." In: Rereading Hopkins: Selected New Essays. Ed. Francis L. Fennell. Victoria: University of Victoria Press, pp. 63–83.
 Trevelyan, Janet Penrose (1923). The Life of Mrs. Humphry Ward. New York: Dodd, Mead and Company, pp. 143–164.
 Tyrell, George (1902). "Two Estimates of Catholic Life." In: The Faith of the Millions; A Selection of Past Essays, Second Series. London, Longmans, Green, and Co., pp. 61–79.
 Waters, Charles T. (1898). "'Helbeck of Bannisdale' and its Critics," The Irish Monthly, Vol. 26, No. 306, pp. 637–646.

External links
 Helbeck of Bannisdale, Vol. II, at Project Gutenberg
 Helbeck of Bannisdale, Vol. II, at Internet Archive
 Helbeck of Bannisdale, at Hathi Trust
 Mrs. Humphry Ward.  A Talk with Her About Her Helbeck—Her Home in the Country

Victorian novels
1898 British novels
British philosophical novels
Novels by Mary Augusta Ward